Marvin Glass and Associates (MGA) was a toy design and engineering firm based in Chicago.  Marvin Glass (1914–1974) and his employees created some of the most successful toys and games of the twentieth century such as Mr. Machine, Rock 'Em Sock 'Em Robots, Lite Brite, Ants in the Pants, Mouse Trap, Operation, Simon, Body Language, and the Evel Knievel Stunt Cycle.

History
Marvin Glass and Associates was founded in 1941. Its founder, Marvin Glass, was an entrepreneur and the creative force behind Marvin Glass and Associates. His salesmanship and uncanny ability to spark creativity in the designers he employed was unparalleled. In 1949, he licensed a "novelty item" to H. Fishlove & Company called Yakity Yak Talking Teeth. This item was invented by Eddy Goldfarb, who worked with Marvin Glass for a very short time after World War II.

The first big hit for Marvin Glass was Mr. Machine, a toy invented by a former watchmaker named Leo Kripak. A child could take Mr. Machine apart and put him back together. It was licensed to Ideal Toys and became such a hit that Lionel Weintraub, its president, made it his company mascot and featured it in many of Ideal's early TV ads. The company became so successful that Marvin Glass got his company logo printed on every package for the items it invented and licensed.

The organization's general counsel, James F. Coffee, and accountant Ernest Sonderling, were the architects of the successful business model whereby the designs and inventions were patented and licensed to various toy companies and manufacturers who would pay running royalties based on sales. Outside counsel, chairman and founder of the Intellectual Property Department at McDermott Will & Emery, Robert J. Schneider, was responsible for procuring the patents and protecting them from infringement. Mr. Schneider is currently co-chair of the Intellectual Property Department of Taft, Stettinius & Hollister LLP.

Joseph M. Burck was a senior designer at Marvin Glass through the mid-1960s to early 1980s and invented or designed many of MGA's hottest items such as Inch Worm, Lite-Brite, Astrolite, Which Witch, Masterpiece, SSP Racers, Chu-Bops, and the Evel Knievel line of toys (Burck was Knievel's personal guest at the infamous Snake River Canyon jump.) Burck holds 10 US patents for items developed by MGA. Time Magazine named Lite-Brite one of the top 100 toys of all time.

Marvin Glass died in 1974. Two years later, managing partner Anson Isaacson, partner Joseph Callan and designer Kathy Dunn were shot and killed and two others seriously wounded at the company's offices in Chicago. The perpetrator was 33-year old Albert Keller, a designer suffering from paranoid delusions who then killed himself.
  
MGA was contracted by Bally-Midway to design coin-operated video games during the 1980s. Some of the games produced by MGA during this era include Tapper, Domino Man and Timber.
 
The company continued in operation until 1988. Several partners from Marvin Glass and Associates subsequently started Chicago-based Big Monster Toys.

Designs by manufacturer

Unknown
 1969 Sketch a Toon

Amurol
 1980 Chu-Bops

Aurora
 1972 Skittle Horseshoes
 1973 Flip It

Cardinal
 1969 Finders Keepers

Fisher-Price Toys
 1988 Smoochees

Gilbert
 1965 James Bond 007 Action Toys
 1965 American Flyer All Aboard Sets

Hasbro
 1963 Ambush!
 1967 That Kid Doll
 1967 Lite Brite
 1969 AstroLite, Astro Sound
 1971 Inchworm, Alley Up
 1973 Super Sunday Football
1974 Ricochet Racers
 1988 C.O.P.s and Crooks

Hubley
 1962 Golferino (See also Milton Bradley)

Ideal
 1960 Mr. Machine
 1961 Robot Commando
 1962 Gaylord, Bop the Beetle, King Zor
 1963 Mouse Trap
 1964 Crazy Clock
 1965 Fish Bait
 1964 Clancy the Great
 1965 Tigeroo Bike Siren
 1966 Babysitter Game
 1967 Careful
 1968 Little Lost Baby
 1969 Ants in the Pants
 1970 Mr. Mad
 1973 Evel Knievel Stunt Cycle
 1977 Mister Rogers' Neighborhood Puppets & Trolley
 1985 Rocks Bugs and Things

Irwin
 1963 Dandy the Lion
 1964 Interior Decorator Set

Kenner
 1970 The Wall Walker
 1970 SSP
 1971 Smash Up Derby
 1972 Blythe Doll
 1975 Hugo Man of Thousand Faces

Lakeside
 1970 Brink Ball
 1970 Mad Marbles

Marx
 1961 Great Garloo
 1963 Penny the Poodle
 1964 Rock 'Em Sock 'Em Robots
 1964 Perils of Pauline (board game)
 1972 Bops 'n Robbers
 1973 Silly Sammy

Matchbox
 1972 Big M-X
 1974 Fighting Furies pirate action figures

Mattel
 1961 PopZaBall

Milton Bradley
 1963 Jungle Hunt
 1964 Time Bomb
 1965 Mystery Date
 1966 Mosquito (game)
 1967 Fang Bang
 1968 Sand Lot Slugger, Bucket of Fun
 1969 Dynamite Shack
 1970 Snoopy and the Red Baron; Which Witch?
 1971 Stay Alive
 1974 Body Language
 1974 Trip Hammer
 1979 SIMON

Parker Brothers
 1968 Situation 4
 1970 Mind Maze, Rattle Battle, The Tiny Tim of Beautiful Things, Twiddler
 1971 Gnip Gnop, Masterpiece
 1974 Tug Boat

Schaper Toys
 1963 King of the Hill
 1966 Thing Ding
 1967 Clean Sweep
 1968 Big Mouth
 1972 Don't Blow Your Top
 1974 Jack Be Nimble

Whitman
 1969 Humor Rumor

References

External links
Video: WBBM Channel 2 Chicago News Feature story and interview of Marvin Glass (1972)
Working at the Marvin Glass Studio - Recollections of a Former Employee by Erick Erickson
Marvin Glass page at Boardgame Geek
Photo: Marvin Glass (center) won't unveil a new toy to a buyer unless he signs a promise not to copy it. Left, engineer John Parks of Glass's staff.

Toy companies of the United States
Defunct toy manufacturers
Defunct video game companies of the United States
Toy inventors
Companies based in Chicago
American companies established in 1941
Consulting firms established in 1941
Design companies established in 1941
American companies disestablished in 1988
1941 establishments in Illinois
1988 disestablishments in Illinois
Defunct companies based in Illinois